Dodecaibidion is a genus of beetles in the family Cerambycidae, containing the following species:

 Dodecaibidion bolivianum Martins & Galileo, 2012
Dodecaibidion brasiliense Martins, 1962
 Dodecaibidion modestum Martins, 1970
 Dodecaibidion ornatipenne Martins, 1970

References

Ibidionini